Jeff Mullins may refer to:

 Jeff Mullins (basketball), American basketball player
 Jeff Mullins (horse trainer), American racehorse trainer